Dynamical energy analysis (DEA) is a method for numerically
modelling structure borne sound and vibration in complex structures.
It is applicable in the mid-to-high frequency range and is in this
regime computational more efficient than traditional deterministic
approaches (such as finite element and
boundary element methods).
In comparison to conventional statistical approaches
such as statistical energy analysis (SEA),
DEA provides more structural details and is less problematic with respect
to subsystem division.
The DEA method predicts the flow of vibrational wave energy across
complex structures in terms of (linear) transport equations.
These equations are then discretized and solved on meshes.

Key point summary of DEA

 High frequency method in numerical acoustics.
 The flow of energy is tracked across a mesh. Can be thought of as ray tracing using density of rays instead of individual rays.
 Can use existing FEM meshes. No remodelling necessary.
 Computational time is independent of frequency.
 The necessary mesh resolution does not depend on frequency and can be chosen coarser than in FEM. It only should resolve the geometry.
 Fine structural details can be resolved, in contrast to SEA which gives only one number per subsystem.
 Greater flexibility for the models usable by DEA. No implicit assumptions (equilibrium in weakly coupled subsystems) as in SEA.

Introduction

Simulations of the vibro-acoustic properties of complex structures
(such as cars, ships, airplanes,...) are routinely
carried out in various design stages.
For low frequencies, the established method of choice is
the finite element method (FEM).
But high frequency analysis using FEM requires very
fine meshes of the body structure to capture the shorter wavelengths and
therefore is computational extremely costly.
Furthermore the structural response at high frequencies is
very sensitive to small variations in material properties,
geometry and boundary conditions. This makes the output of a single
FEM calculation less reliable and makes ensemble averages
necessary furthermore enhancing computational cost.
Therefore at high frequencies other numerical methods
with better computational efficiency are preferable.

The statistical energy analysis (SEA)
has been developed to deal
with high frequency problems and leads to relatively small and simple models.
However, SEA is based on a set of often hard to verify assumptions,
which effectively require diffuse wave fields and quasi-equilibrium of wave energy
within weakly coupled (and weakly damped) sub-systems.

One alternative to SEA is to instead consider the original vibrational
wave problem in the high frequency limit, leading to a ray tracing model
of the structural vibrations.
The tracking of individual rays across
multiple reflection is not computational feasible because of the
proliferation of trajectories.
Instead, a better approach is tracking densities of rays
propagated by a transfer operator.
This forms the basis of the Dynamical Energy Analysis (DEA) method introduced in reference.
DEA can be seen as an improvement over SEA where one lifts the diffusive field
and the well separated subsystem assumption.
One uses an energy density which depends both on position and momentum.
DEA can work with relatively fine meshes where energy can flow freely between
neighboring mesh cells.
This allows far greater flexibility for the models used by DEA in
comparison to the restriction imposed by SEA.
No remodeling as for SEA is necessary
as DEA can use meshes created for a FE analysis.
As a result, finer structural details than SEA can be resolved by DEA.

Method

The implementation of DEA on meshes is called Discrete Flow Mapping (DFM).
We will here briefly describe the idea behind DFM, for details see the
references

below.
Using DFM it is possible to compute vibro-acoustic energy densities in complex structures
at high frequencies, including multi-modal propagation and curved surfaces.
DFM is a mesh based technique where a transfer operator is used to describe the flow of
energy through boundaries of subsystems of the structure; the energy flow is represented
in terms of a density of rays , that is, the energy flux through a given surface is
given through the density of rays passing through the surface at point  with direction
.
the surface. In what follows, the surfaces is represented by the union of all boundaries
of the mesh cells of the FE mesh describing the car floor. The density ,
with phase space coordinate , is transported from one boundary
to the adjacent boundary intersection via the boundary integral operator

where  is the map determining where a ray starting on a boundary segment at
point  with direction  passes through another boundary segment, and
 is a
factor containing damping and reflection/transmission coefficients (akin to the coupling loss factors in SEA).
It also governs the mode conversion probabilities in the case of both in-plane and flexural
waves, which are derived from wave scattering theory (see).
This allows DEA to take curvature and varying material parameters into account.
Equation is a way to write ray tracing across one single mesh cell in terms
of an integral equation transferring an energy density from one surface to an adjacent surface.

In a next step, the transfer operator is discretised
using a set of basis functions of the phase space.
Once the matrix  has been constructed, the final energy density
  on the boundary phase-space of each element is given
in terms of the initial density 
by the solution of a linear system of the form

The initial density  models some source distribution for vibrational excitations,
for example the engine in ship. Once the final density  (describing the energy density
on all cell boundaries) has been computed, the energy density at
any location inside the structure may be computed as a post-processing step.

Concerning the terminology, there is some ambiguity concerning the terms "Discrete Flow Mapping(DFM)"
and "Dynamical Energy Analysis". To some extent, one can use one term in place of the other.
For example, consider a plate. In DFM, one would subdivide the plate into many small triangles
and propagate the flow of energy from triangle to (neighbouring) triangle.
In DEA, one would not subdivide the plate, but use some high order basis functions (both in position
and momentum) on the boundary of the plate. But in principle it would be admissible to describe both
procedures as either DFM or DEA.

Examples

As an example application, a simulation

of a carfloor panel is shown here.
A point excitation at 2500 Hz with 0.04 hysteretic damping was applied. The results from a frequency averaged FEM simulation are compared with a DEA simulation (for DEA, no frequency averaging is necessary).
The results also show a good quantitative agreement. In particular, we see the directional dependence of the energy flow, which is predominantly in the horizontal direction as plotted. This is caused by several horizontally extended out-of-plane
bulges. It is only in the lower right part of the panel, with negligible energy content, that deviations between the FEM and DFM predictions are visible.  The total kinetic energy given by the DFM prediction is within 12% of the FEM prediction.
For more details, see the cited works.

As a more applied example, the result of a DEA simulation
on a Yanmar tractor model (body in blue: chassis/cabin steel frame and windows) 
is shown here to the left.
In the cited work, the numerical DEA results are compared with experimental measurements at frequencies between 400 Hz and 4000 Hz
for an excitation on the back of the gear casing. Both results agree favorably. The DEA simulation can be extended to predict the
sound pressure level at driver's ear.

Notes

References

External links
University of Nottingham Wave Modelling Research Group. One of the foci of this research group is on DEA.

Mechanical vibrations
Acoustics